Spermatogenic leucine zipper protein 1 is a protein that in humans is encoded by the SPZ1 gene.

References

Further reading